Andrew James Mack (born 14 January 1956) is a former English cricketer. Mack was a left-handed batsman who bowled left-arm medium pace. He was born at Aylsham, Norfolk.

References

External links
Andy Mack at ESPNcricinfo
Andy Mack at CricketArchive

1956 births
Living people
People from Aylsham
English cricketers
Surrey cricketers
Glamorgan cricketers
Norfolk cricketers
Minor Counties cricketers
Sportspeople from Norfolk